Roland Selmeczi (10 October 1969 – 30 January 2008) was a Hungarian actor. He played in theatre plays, in movies and television series, and provided dub in many television series like House M.D. (Dr. James Wilson), 24 (Jack Bauer), Sliders (Quinn Mallory) and Desperate Housewives (Mike Delfino). He also was known to dub Brad Pitt and Antonio Banderas several times.

He died in a car accident on 30 January 2008. He was 38 years old.

References

External links 
 Theatre roles on Szinház.hu

1969 births
2008 deaths
Male actors from Budapest
Hungarian male film actors
Hungarian male stage actors
Hungarian male television actors
Road incident deaths in Hungary